IOMAI was a Biotech company founded in 1997 by Gregory Glenn M.D. of the Walter Reed Army Institute of Research and Dean Lewis, a World Bank employee. The company was the first to develop the concept of transcutaneous immunization, delivery of vaccines to the skin using a patch or similar method. This provided a means to stimulate robust immune responses safely as the skin patch-based immunization targeted Langerhans cells in the skin. The patch technology underwent extensive evaluation in the context of a traveler's diarrhea vaccine which entered Phase 3 pivotal trials in 2009. IOMAI was acquired by Intercell in 2008 and the technology was the subject of a development license to GSK in 2009. Dr. Glenn pioneered needle free delivery to the skin and spawned general interest in skin-targeting vaccine technologies, including intradermal delivery and the use of the heat labile toxin as an adjuvant and the adjuvant patch.

See also 
Transdermal patch

References 

 
 
 
 
 

Biotechnology companies of the United States